Dorothy N. Monekosso is a British academic. She is a professor of computer science in the Department of Computer Science at University of Durham. She researches ambient assisted living (AAL), intelligent environments, smart homes, and assistive robotics.

Monekosso began her career in space technology research at Surrey Satellite Technology, developing on-board computers and other systems for small satellites and spacecraft. During her PhD at the Surrey Space Centre, she became interested in machine learning, and moved into developing intelligent and robotic systems for security and healthcare applications.

In 2015, she moved from Bournemouth University to take up her current professorship of computer science at Leeds Beckett University.

In March 2020, she was among the 40 black women professors celebrated in the photographic exhibition Phenomenal Women. Also in 2020, Monekosso was awarded an Honorary Fellowship of the British Computer Society for her work on Smart Homes for people living with dementia and for her campaigning work to promote diversity in the tech sector.

Works
 (ed. with Paolo Remagnino and Yoshinori Kuno) Intelligent environments: methods, algorithms and applications. London: Springer, 2008.
 ed. with Paolo Remagnino and Lakhmi C. Jain) Innovations in defence support systems. 3, Intelligent paradigms in security. Berlin: Springer, 2011.
 (with Myo Thida, How-lung Eng and Paolo Remagnino) Contextual analysis of videos. San Rafael, California : Morgan & Claypool, 2013.

References

External links
 Academic webpage at Leeds Beckett University
 Truly smart homes could help dementia patients live independently, The Conversation

Year of birth missing (living people)
Living people
British computer scientists
Black British women academics
British women computer scientists
Alumni of the University of Surrey
Academics of Bournemouth University
Academics of Leeds Beckett University
Fellows of the British Computer Society